Refuge Barmasse is a refuge in the Alps in Aosta Valley, Italy.

Mountain huts in the Alps
Mountain huts in Aosta Valley